Jan Otčenášek (19 November 1924, Prague – 24 February 1979, Prague) was a Czech novelist and playwright.

Biography
Otčenášek was born in the Žižkov district of Prague. His father was a joiner. He graduated from business school in 1943, briefly worked in Germany, then was employed at the Avia Motors factory. 

Later, he joined the Communist Party and studied aesthetics at Charles University, although he had to drop out due to family problems.

In 1960, he decided to become a freelance writer. From 1973 on, he was a screenwriter at Barrandov Studios. For twenty years, he lived with the actress, Libuše Švormová.

He died in Prague, of lung cancer.

Works
Limping Orpheus (Kulhavý Orfeus) is a semiautobiographical description of resistance by a group of young people mobilised by the Germans as munitions workers in the Totaleinsatz. His most popular work, Romeo, Juliet and Darkness (Romeo, Julie a tma), about a young couple during the Nazi occupation, after the assassination of Reinhard Heydrich was, in 1960, made into a film, directed by Jiří Weiss and starring Ivan Mistrík, Daniela Smutná, and Jiřina Šejbalová. In 1963 it was made into  an opera by the Soviet composer Kirill Molchanov.

References

1924 births
Writers from Prague
1979 deaths
Czech male writers
Socialist realism writers
Deaths from lung cancer
Deaths from cancer in Czechoslovakia
Deaths from cancer in the Czech Republic